Kenneth William Smyth (born 4 October 1948) is a former Australian politician.

He was born in Rockhampton to Frederick Tomas Smyth and Annie Maud, née Gray; his parents separated two years after his birth. He attended both state and Catholic schools in Mackay before becoming a carpenter and then a miner with the Utah Company's Peak Downs coalmine. A member of the Labor Party, he was a Belyando Shire Councillor from 1982 to 1991 and in 1986 was elected as the member for Bowen in the Queensland Legislative Assembly. In 1992 his seat was abolished and he ran unsuccessfully for Charters Towers.

References

1948 births
Living people
Members of the Queensland Legislative Assembly
Australian Labor Party members of the Parliament of Queensland